Leotta is an Italian surname which is most prevalent in the region of Sicily and is also to be found among the Argentinian, American, Australian and Brazilian Italian diaspora. Notable people with the surname include:
 Allison Leotta, American novelist, former prosecutor and blogger
 Christian Leotta (born 1980), Italian pianist
 Diletta Leotta (born 1991), Italian television presenter

See also 
 Leotta Whytock (1890–1972), American film editor and actress

References

Italian-language surnames